The Tanker War was a protracted series of armed skirmishes between Iran and Iraq against merchant vessels in the Persian Gulf and Strait of Hormuz from 1984 to 1988. The conflict was a part of the larger Iran–Iraq War.

Background

Prior to 1984, attacks against shipping had occurred, albeit on a much smaller scale. In December 1980, UN Secretary General appealed to Iran and Iraq to ensure the security of peaceful shipping in the Gulf. At that time, Iran assured other countries that it would keep the Strait of Hormuz open.

Overview 
The Tanker War was initiated in 1984 by Iraq. Kuwait and Saudi Arabia supported Iraq against Iran, while the United States intervened in the conflict in 1986 to "protect" Kuwaiti tankers and subsequently engaged in a confrontation with Iran.

Both sides had declared an "exclusion zone", meaning areas in which they had warned ships from entering. Iraq declared the area around Iran's Kharg Island to be an exclusion zone. Kharg Island hosted Iran's principal oil shipment port. Iraq gave precise definition, in coordinates, of this exclusion zone and gave advance notification to all countries. However, Iraq did not designate any safe passage routes in this zone. Iran declared all waters adjacent to its coast, up to 40 miles out, to be its exclusion zone. It instructed ships headed for non-Iranian ports to sail west of this line. While Iran also did not designate any safe passages in its exclusion zone, this wasn't necessary. Iran's exclusion zone allowed for ships to enter and exit the Gulf, and essentially only kept such foreign ships out of its own waters. Ironically, Iran's exclusion zone made it easier for Iraq to target Iranian ships. It allowed Iraq to assume that any ship in Iran's territorial waters must be going to (or coming from) an Iranian port.

List of attacks

1984

1985

1986

1987

1988

Notes

References

Footnotes

Sources

Further reading 
 
 
 
 

Iran–Iraq War
History of the Persian Gulf
Maritime incidents in 1984
Maritime incidents in 1985
Maritime incidents in 1986
Maritime incidents in 1987
Maritime incidents in 1988